Rangia may refer to
Rangia or Rangiya, a city in Assam
Rangia (bivalve), a genus of bivalve molluscs